Three is the third EP by Welsh recording artist Charlotte Church. It is the third in a series of four EPs released by Church. Her third alternative rock material, it was released on 19 August 2013 and preceded by two singles "I Can Dream" and "Water Tower".

Track listing

References

2013 EPs
Charlotte Church albums